The 1998 Toronto Blue Jays season was the franchise's 22nd season of Major League Baseball. It resulted in the Blue Jays finishing third in the American League East with a record of 88 wins and 74 losses, which was their best record since their 1993 World Series-winning season; the 88 wins were not surpassed until 2015.

With the disappointing last-place finish of the previous year, General Manager Gord Ash once again dug into the wallet to improve the team, signing reliever Randy Myers and slugger José Canseco as free agents.  Though the team improved noticeably (thanks to another pitching Triple Crown and Cy Young Award-winning campaign by ace hurler Roger Clemens and a powerful lineup that featured Canseco, Carlos Delgado, Shawn Green, and José Cruz Jr.), they could not finish ahead of the New York Yankees or the Boston Red Sox, who won 114 and 92 games en route to winning the division crown and wild card respectively.

Offseason
October 29, 1997: Dane Johnson was selected off waivers by the Toronto Blue Jays from the Oakland Athletics.
November 18, 1997: Omar Daal was drafted by the Arizona Diamondbacks from the Toronto Blue Jays as the 31st pick in the 1997 expansion draft.
 November 26, 1997: Randy Myers signed as a free agent with the Toronto Blue Jays.
November 27, 1997: Craig Grebeck was signed as a free agent with the Toronto Blue Jays.
 December 6, 1997: Juan Samuel was signed as a free agent with the Toronto Blue Jays.
December 8, 1997: Tony Fernandez was signed as a free agent with the Toronto Blue Jays.
January 5, 1998: Jacob Brumfield was signed as a free agent with the Toronto Blue Jays.
 February 4, 1998: José Canseco signed as a free agent with the Toronto Blue Jays.
March 24, 1998: Jacob Brumfield was released by the Toronto Blue Jays.
March 14, 1998: Tim Crabtree was traded by the Toronto Blue Jays to the Texas Rangers for Kevin Brown.

Regular season

Season standings

Record vs. opponents

Notable transactions
 June 2, 1998: Felipe López was drafted by the Toronto Blue Jays in the 1st round (8th pick) of the 1998 amateur draft. Player signed August 11, 1998.
 July 1, 1998: Tony Phillips was signed as a free agent with the Toronto Blue Jays.
July 31, 1998: Tony Phillips was traded by the Toronto Blue Jays to the New York Mets for Leo Estrella.
August 6, 1998: Randy Myers was traded by the Toronto Blue Jays to the San Diego Padres for Brian Loyd (minors).

Roster

Game log

|- align="center" bgcolor="bbffbb"
| 1 || April 1 || Twins || 3 – 2 || Clemens (1-0) || Tewksbury (0-1) || Myers (1) || 41,387 || 1-0
|- align="center" bgcolor="ffbbbb"
| 2 || April 2 || Twins || 3 – 2 || Guardado (1-0) || Escobar (0-1) || Aguilera (1) || 25,584 || 1-1
|- align="center" bgcolor="ffbbbb"
| 3 || April 3 || Rangers || 5 – 0 || Helling (1-0) || Guzmán (0-1) || || 25,509 || 1-2
|- align="center" bgcolor="bbffbb"
| 4 || April 4 || Rangers || 9 – 2 || Williams (1-0) || Oliver (0-1) || || 30,156 || 2-2
|- align="center" bgcolor="ffbbbb"
| 5 || April 5 || Rangers || 6 – 5 || Burkett (1-1) || Risley (0-1) || Wetteland (1) || 28,106 || 2-3
|- align="center" bgcolor="ffbbbb"
| 6 || April 7 || @ Twins || 12 – 2 || Tewksbury (1-1) || Clemens (1-1) || || 8,421 || 2-4
|- align="center" bgcolor="bbffbb"
| 7 || April 8 || @ Twins || 9 – 6 || Hentgen (1-0) || Hawkins (0-1) || Myers (2) || 8,532 || 3-4
|- align="center" bgcolor="ffbbbb"
| 8 || April 9 || @ Twins || 13 – 2 || Radke (1-1) || Guzmán (0-2) || || 9,075 || 3-5
|- align="center" bgcolor="ffbbbb"
| 9 || April 10 || @ Rangers || 4 – 3 || Helling (2-0) || Plesac (0-1) || Wetteland (2) || 32,314 || 3-6
|- align="center" bgcolor="bbffbb"
| 10 || April 11 || @ Rangers || 9 – 8 || Almanzar (1-0) || Oliver (0-2) || Myers (3) || 37,520 || 4-6
|- align="center" bgcolor="ffbbbb"
| 11 || April 12 || @ Rangers || 3 – 1 || Wetteland (1-0) || Quantrill (0-1) || || 28,435 || 4-7
|- align="center" bgcolor="ffbbbb"
| 12 || April 13 || @ Royals || 11 – 1 || Rusch (1-2) || Hentgen (1-1) || || 11,749 || 4-8
|- align="center" bgcolor="bbffbb"
| 13 || April 14 || @ Royals || 5 – 1 || Guzmán (1-2) || Rapp (0-1) || Quantrill (1) || 11,194 || 5-8
|- align="center" bgcolor="ffbbbb"
| 14 || April 15 || @ Royals || 7 – 3 || Haney (2-0) || Williams  (1-1) || || 11,316 || 5-9
|- align="center" bgcolor="bbffbb"
| 15 || April 17 || White Sox || 6 – 1 || Clemens (2-1) || Bere (0-3) || || 28,240 || 6-9
|- align="center" bgcolor="bbffbb"
| 16 || April 18 || White Sox || 9 – 4 || Hentgen (2-1) || Navarro (1-2) || || 29,065 || 7-9
|- align="center" bgcolor="bbffbb"
| 17 || April 19 || White Sox || 5 – 4 (12) || Carpenter (1-0) || Castillo (0-1)  || || 31,265 || 8-9
|- align="center" bgcolor="ffbbbb"
| 18 || April 20 || Yankees || 3 – 2 (11) || Banks (1-0) || Risley (0-2) || Stanton (4) || 26,385 || 8-10
|- align="center" bgcolor="ffbbbb"
| 19 || April 21 || Yankees || 5 – 3 (10) || Stanton (1-0) || Plesac (0-2) || || 27,192 || 8-11
|- align="center" bgcolor="ffbbbb"
| 20 || April 22 || Yankees || 9 – 1 || Pettitte (3-2) || Clemens (2-2) || || 29,164 || 8-12
|- align="center" bgcolor="bbffbb"
| 21 || April 24 || @ White Sox || 3 – 1 || Hentgen (3-1) || Navarro (1-3) || Myers (4) || 14,198 || 9-12
|- align="center" bgcolor="ffbbbb"
| 22 || April 25 || @ White Sox || 8 – 1 || Eyre (1-2) || Guzmán (1-3) || || 14,457 || 9-13
|- align="center"
| 23 || April 26 || @ White Sox || 5 – 5 (6) || colspan=3|Postponed (rain) Rescheduled for July 15 || 13,705 || 9-13
|- align="center" bgcolor="ffbbbb"
| 24 || April 27 || @ Yankees || 1 – 0 || Pettitte (4-2) || Clemens (2-3) || Rivera (2) || 17,863 || 9-14
|- align="center" bgcolor="bbffbb"
| 25 || April 28 || @ Yankees || 5 – 2 || Williams  (2-1) || Mendoza (0-1) || Myers (5) || 18,727 || 10-14
|- align="center" bgcolor="ffbbbb"
| 26 || April 29 || Royals || 7 – 2 || Pichardo (1-2) || Hentgen (3-2) || || 25,644 || 10-15
|- align="center" bgcolor="ffbbbb"
| 27 || April 30 || Royals || 7 – 4 || Rusch (3-3) || Guzmán (1-4) || Montgomery (5) || 26,690 || 10-16
|-

|- align="center" bgcolor="ffbbbb"
| 28 || May 1 || @ Athletics || 5 – 2 || Candiotti (3-3) || Hanson (0-1) || Taylor (7) || 7,078 || 10-17
|- align="center" bgcolor="bbffbb"
| 29 || May 2 || @ Athletics || 7 – 0 || Clemens (3-3) || Oquist (0-1) || || 10,729 || 11-17
|- align="center" bgcolor="bbffbb"
| 30 || May 3 || @ Athletics || 6 – 3 || Williams  (3-1) || Telgheder (0-1) || Myers (6) || 23,463 || 12-17
|- align="center" bgcolor="ffbbbb"
| 31 || May 4 || @ Athletics || 7 – 4 || Rogers (5-1) || Hentgen (3-3) || || 5,206 || 12-18
|- align="center" bgcolor="bbffbb"
| 32 || May 5 || @ Angels || 13 – 11 || Plesac (1-2) || Percival (0-2) || Myers (7) || 17,271 || 13-18
|- align="center" bgcolor="bbffbb"
| 33 || May 6 || @ Angels || 6 – 5 || Escobar (1-1) || Hasegawa (1-1) || Myers (8) || 17,392 || 14-18
|- align="center" bgcolor="bbffbb"
| 34 || May 7 || @ Mariners || 6 – 0 || Clemens (4-3) || Moyer (2-4) || || 24,129 || 15-18
|- align="center" bgcolor="ffbbbb"
| 35 || May 8 || @ Mariners || 8 – 3 || Johnson (3-1) || Williams  (3-2) || || 29,920 || 15-19
|- align="center" bgcolor="bbffbb"
| 36 || May 9 || @ Mariners || 4 – 1 || Hentgen (4-3) || Swift (2-2) || Myers (9) || 49,851 || 16-19
|- align="center" bgcolor="ffbbbb"
| 37 || May 10 || @ Mariners || 3 – 1 || Fassero (4-1) || Guzmán (1-5) || Ayala (7) || 39,249 || 16-20
|- align="center" bgcolor="bbffbb"
| 38 || May 12 || Athletics || 4 – 3 (10)|| Myers (1-0) || Taylor (0-3) || || 25,636 || 17-20
|- align="center" bgcolor="ffbbbb"
| 39 || May 13 || Athletics || 4 – 2 || Haynes (2-1) || Clemens (4-4) || Fetters (2) || 25,732 || 17-21
|- align="center" bgcolor="bbffbb"
| 40 || May 14 || Angels || 5 – 4 || Myers (2-0) || DeLucia (1-2) || || 25,606 || 18-21
|- align="center" bgcolor="bbffbb"
| 41 || May 15 || Angels || 9 – 1 || Hentgen (5-3) || Hill (6-2) || || 26,644 || 19-21
|- align="center" bgcolor="ffbbbb"
| 42 || May 16 || Mariners || 8 – 1 || Fassero (5-1) || Guzmán (1-6) || || 31,121 || 19-22
|- align="center" bgcolor="bbffbb"
| 43 || May 17 || Mariners || 4 – 3 || Plesac (2-2) || Slocumb (1-3) || || 28,111 || 20-22
|- align="center" bgcolor="ffbbbb"
| 44 || May 18 || Mariners || 9 – 4 || Spoljaric (3-0) || Clemens (4-5) || || 28,125 || 20-23
|- align="center" bgcolor="bbffbb"
| 45 || May 19 || Devil Rays || 3 – 1 || Williams  (4-2) || Springer (1-7) || Myers (10) || 25,662 || 21-23
|- align="center" bgcolor="bbffbb"
| 46 || May 20 || Devil Rays || 9 – 1 || Hentgen (6-3) || Álvarez (4-5) || || 26,107 || 22-23
|- align="center" bgcolor="bbffbb"
| 47 || May 21 || Devil Rays || 6 – 1 || Guzmán (2-6) || Arrojo (6-3) || || 30,108 || 23-23
|- align="center" bgcolor="ffbbbb"
| 48 || May 22 || @ Indians || 9 – 7 || Burba (5-4) || Hanson (0-2) || Jackson (12) || 43,269 || 23-24
|- align="center" bgcolor="bbffbb"
| 49 || May 23 || @ Indians || 7 – 2 || Clemens (5-5) || Colón (3-3) || || 43,306 || 24-24
|- align="center" bgcolor="bbffbb"
| 50 || May 24 || @ Indians || 5 – 0 || Williams  (5-2) || Gooden (0-1) || || 43,194 || 25-24
|- align="center" bgcolor="bbffbb"
| 51 || May 25 || @ Red Sox || 7 – 5 || Hentgen (7-3) || Martínez (5-1) || Myers (11) || 32,342 || 26-24
|- align="center" bgcolor="bbffbb"
| 52 || May 26 || @ Red Sox || 5 – 2 || Guzmán (3-6) || Avery (1-1) || Myers (12) || 27,668 || 27-24
|- align="center" bgcolor="ffbbbb"
| 53 || May 28 || Indians || 6 – 2 || Burba (6-4) || Carpenter (1-1) || || 30,282 || 27-25
|- align="center" bgcolor="ffbbbb"
| 54 || May 29 || Indians || 7 – 3 || Colón (4-3) || Clemens (5-6) || || 29,085 || 27-26
|- align="center" bgcolor="bbffbb"
| 55 || May 30 || Indians || 4 – 2 || Williams  (6-2) || Gooden (0-2) || Myers (13) || 37,179 || 28-26
|- align="center" bgcolor="ffbbbb"
| 56 || May 31 || Indians || 8 – 3 || Nagy (7-2) || Hentgen (7-4) || Mesa (1) || 30,090 || 28-27
|-

|- align="center" bgcolor="ffbbbb"
| 57 || June 1 || Red Sox || 9 – 5 || Corsi (2-0) || Myers (2-1) || || 27,372 || 28-28
|- align="center" bgcolor="ffbbbb"
| 58 || June 2 || Red Sox || 11 – 3 || Avery (2-1) || Carpenter (1-2) || || 26,177 || 28-29
|- align="center" bgcolor="bbffbb"
| 59 || June 3 || Tigers || 5 – 1 || Clemens (6-6) || Greisinger (0-1) || || 26,291 || 29-29
|- align="center" bgcolor="bbffbb"
| 60 || June 4 || Tigers || 9 – 6 || Williams  (7-2) || Moehler (5-5) || Myers (14) || 34,408 || 30-29
|- align="center" bgcolor="ffbbbb"
| 61 || June 5 || Phillies || 8 – 7 || Green (4-4) || Risley (0-3) || Leiter (11) || 31,176 || 30-30
|- align="center" bgcolor="ffbbbb"
| 62 || June 6 || Phillies || 10 – 6 || Gomes (5-2) || Guzmán (3-7) || || 30,102 || 30-31
|- align="center" bgcolor="bbffbb"
| 63 || June 7 || Phillies || 3 – 1 || Carpenter (2-2) || Schilling (5-7) || Myers (15) || 26,236 || 31-31
|- align="center" bgcolor="ffbbbb"
| 64 || June 8 || @ Marlins || 4 – 3 (17)|| Edmondson (1-1) || Hanson (0-3) || || 17,414 || 31-32
|- align="center" bgcolor="ffbbbb"
| 65 || June 9 || @ Marlins || 5 – 4 || Hernández (4-4) || Quantrill (0-2) || || 14,591 || 31-33
|- align="center" bgcolor="bbffbb"
| 66 || June 10 || @ Marlins || 4 – 3 (10)|| Person (1-0) || Powell (4-4) || Myers (16) || 16,994 || 32-33
|- align="center" bgcolor="ffbbbb"
| 67 || June 12 || Orioles || 9 – 5 || Mussina (5-3) || Guzmán (3-8) || || 30,237 || 32-34
|- align="center" bgcolor="bbffbb"
| 68 || June 13 || Orioles || 9 – 8 || Person (2-0) || Drabek (5-7) || Myers (17) || 38,102 || 33-34
|- align="center" bgcolor="bbffbb"
| 69 || June 14 || Orioles || 7 – 4 || Clemens (7-6) || Smith (0-1) || Myers (18) || 28,132 || 34-34
|- align="center" bgcolor="ffbbbb"
| 70 || June 15 || @ Devil Rays || 8 – 7 || White (1-3) || Quantrill (0-3) || Hernández (13) || 24,122 || 34-35
|- align="center" bgcolor="ffbbbb"
| 71 || June 16 || @ Devil Rays || 4 – 3 || Mecir (3-0) || Myers (2-2) || || 24,278 || 34-36
|- align="center" bgcolor="ffbbbb"
| 72 || June 17 || @ Devil Rays || 2 – 1 || Arrojo (9-4) || Guzmán (3-9) || Hernández (14) || 24,394 || 34-37
|- align="center" bgcolor="bbffbb"
| 73 || June 18 || @ Orioles || 13 – 6 || Carpenter (3-2) || Johns (2-2) || || 47,374 || 35-37
|- align="center" bgcolor="ffbbbb"
| 74 || June 19 || @ Orioles || 7 – 4 (15)|| Charlton (2-1) || Risley (0-4) || || 47,012 || 35-38
|- align="center" bgcolor="ffbbbb"
| 75 || June 20 || @ Orioles || 11 – 3 || Erickson (8-6) || Williams  (7-3) || || 48,011 || 35-39
|- align="center" bgcolor="bbffbb"
| 76 || June 21 || @ Orioles || 7 – 3 || Hentgen (8-4) || Ponson (1-5) || Myers (19) || 47,522 || 36-39
|- align="center" bgcolor="bbffbb"
| 77 || June 22 || Expos || 14 – 2 || Guzmán (4-9) || Pavano (1-1) || || 33,132 || 37-39
|- align="center" bgcolor="bbffbb"
| 78 || June 23 || Expos || 3 – 2 || Carpenter (4-2) || Batista (2-4) || Myers (20) || 33,492 || 38-39
|- align="center" bgcolor="bbffbb"
| 79 || June 24 || @ Expos || 7 – 6 || Clemens (8-6) || Boskie (1-1) || Myers (21) || 16,515 || 39-39
|- align="center" bgcolor="bbffbb"
| 80 || June 25 || @ Expos || 1 – 0 || Williams  (8-3) || Pérez (6-7) || || 9,256 || 40-39
|- align="center" bgcolor="bbffbb"
| 81 || June 26 || @ Braves || 6 – 4 || Hentgen (9-4) || Smoltz (5-2) || Myers (22) || 47,081 || 41-39
|- align="center" bgcolor="ffbbbb"
| 82 || June 27 || @ Braves || 2 – 0 || Maddux (11-2) || Guzmán (4-10) || || 48,338 || 41-40
|- align="center" bgcolor="ffbbbb"
| 83 || June 28 || @ Braves || 10 – 3 || Glavine (11-3) || Carpenter (4-3) || || 44,185 || 41-41
|- align="center" bgcolor="bbffbb"
| 84 || June 30 || Mets || 6 – 3 || Clemens (9-6) || Reed (9-5) || || 30,322 || 42-41
|-

|- align="center" bgcolor="bbffbb"
| 85 || July 1 || Mets || 15 – 10 || Plesac (3-2) || Rojas (3-2) || || 37,252 || 43-41
|- align="center" bgcolor="ffbbbb"
| 86 || July 2 || Mets || 9 – 1 || Jones (7-5) || Hentgen (9-5) || || 27,325 || 43-42
|- align="center" bgcolor="bbffbb"
| 87 || July 3 || Devil Rays || 3 – 2 (10)|| Myers (3-2) || Yan (4-2) || || 25,625 || 44-42
|- align="center" bgcolor="bbffbb"
| 88 || July 4 || Devil Rays || 8 – 0 || Carpenter (5-3) || Springer (2-11) || || 29,198 || 45-42
|- align="center" bgcolor="bbffbb"
| 89 || July 5 || Devil Rays || 2 – 1 || Quantrill (1-3) || White (1-4) || Myers (23) || 31,240 || 46-42
|- align="center" bgcolor="ffbbbb"
| 90 || July 9 || @ Tigers || 4 – 3 || Anderson (2-0) || Plesac (3-3) || Jones (15) || 16,012 || 46-43
|- align="center" bgcolor="ffbbbb"
| 91 || July 10 || @ Tigers || 3 – 2 (10)|| Jones (1-3) || Quantrill (1-4) || || 23,394 || 46-44
|- align="center" bgcolor="ffbbbb"
| 92 || July 11 || @ Tigers || 5 – 2 || Moehler (9-6) || Carpenter (5-4) || Runyan (1) || 21,072 || 46-45
|- align="center" bgcolor="bbffbb"
| 93 || July 12 || @ Tigers || 7 – 2 || Clemens (10-6) || Brocail (4-2) || || 20,231 || 47-45
|- align="center" bgcolor="ffbbbb"
| 94 || July 13 || @ Orioles || 5 – 0 || Rodríguez (1-2) || Guzmán (4-11) || || 41,474 || 47-46
|- align="center" bgcolor="ffbbbb"
| 95 || July 14 || @ Orioles || 11 – 5 || Mussina (7-5) || Williams  (8-4) || || 44,122 || 47-47
|- align="center" bgcolor="ffbbbb"
| 96 || July 15 || @ White Sox || 9 – 3 || Navarro (8-10) || Hentgen (9-6) || || || 47-48
|- align="center" bgcolor="ffbbbb"
| 97 || July 15 || @ White Sox || 5 – 2 || Castillo (4-4) || Stieb (0-1) || Simas (7) || 15,602 || 47-49
|- align="center" bgcolor="bbffbb"
| 98 || July 16 || @ White Sox || 5 – 2 || Carpenter (6-4) || Baldwin (4-4) || Myers (24) || 19,638 || 48-49
|- align="center" bgcolor="bbffbb"
| 99 || July 17 || Yankees || 9 – 6 || Clemens (11-6) || Holmes (0-2) || Myers (25) || 39,172 || 49-49
|- align="center" bgcolor="ffbbbb"
| 100 || July 18 || Yankees || 10 – 3 || Hernández (4-2) || Guzmán (4-12) || || 48,123 || 49-50
|- align="center" bgcolor="bbffbb"
| 101 || July 19 || Yankees || 9 – 3 || Williams  (9-4) || Pettitte (12-6) || || 42,176 || 50-50
|- align="center" bgcolor="ffbbbb"
| 102 || July 21 || White Sox || 6 – 3 || Baldwin (5-4) || Hentgen (9-7) || Simas (8) || 30,209 || 50-51
|- align="center" bgcolor="bbffbb"
| 103 || July 22 || White Sox || 4 – 0 || Clemens (12-6) || Parque (2-3) || || 29,221 || 51-51
|- align="center" bgcolor="ffbbbb"
| 104 || July 23 || @ Red Sox || 8 – 7 (10)|| Gordon (5-3) || Myers (3-3) || || 33,011 || 51-52
|- align="center" bgcolor="bbffbb"
| 105 || July 24 || @ Red Sox || 10 – 6 || Guzmán (5-12) || Avery (7-3) || Quantrill (2) || 33,159 || 52-52
|- align="center" bgcolor="ffbbbb"
| 106 || July 25 || @ Red Sox || 5 – 3 || Lowe (1-7) || Williams  (9-5) || Gordon (28) || 33,099 || 52-53
|- align="center" bgcolor="ffbbbb"
| 107 || July 26 || @ Red Sox || 6 – 3 || Martínez (14-3) || Hentgen (9-8) || || 33,059 || 52-54
|- align="center" bgcolor="bbffbb"
| 108 || July 28 || Rangers || 8 – 3 || Clemens (13-6) || Sele (12-8) || || 29,177 || 53-54
|- align="center" bgcolor="ffbbbb"
| 109 || July 29 || Rangers || 9 – 6 || Oliver (6-7) || Carpenter (6-5) || Wetteland (28) || 28,220 || 53-55
|- align="center" bgcolor="bbffbb"
| 110 || July 30 || Rangers || 1 – 0 || Guzmán (6-12) || Loaiza (0-2) || Myers (26) || 29,264 || 54-55
|- align="center" bgcolor="ffbbbb"
| 111 || July 31 || @ Twins || 6 – 4 || Rodriguez (1-0) || Williams  (9-6) || Aguilera (27) || 26,054 || 54-56
|-

|- align="center" bgcolor="bbffbb"
| 112 || August 1 || @ Twins || 10 – 9 || Hentgen (10-8) || Hawkins (7-10) || Myers (27) || 17,128 || 55-56
|- align="center" bgcolor="bbffbb"
| 113 || August 2 || @ Twins || 6 – 4 || Clemens (14-6) || Radke (10-9) || Myers (28) || 40,096 || 56-56
|- align="center" bgcolor="ffbbbb"
| 114 || August 4 || @ Rangers || 11 – 9 || Stottlemyre (1-0) || Carpenter (6-6) || Wetteland (29) || 45,213 || 56-57
|- align="center" bgcolor="ffbbbb"
| 115 || August 5 || @ Rangers || 4 – 3 || Wetteland (3-1) || Myers (3-4) || || 27,766 || 56-58
|- align="center" bgcolor="ffbbbb"
| 116 || August 7 || Athletics || 7 – 6 || Haynes (8-4) || Williams  (9-7) || Fetters (5) || 31,286 || 56-59
|- align="center" bgcolor="bbffbb"
| 117 || August 8 || Athletics || 6 – 5 (10)|| Plesac (4-3) || Fetters (1-6) || || 31,330 || 57-59
|- align="center" bgcolor="bbffbb"
| 118 || August 9 || Athletics || 4 – 3 || Quantrill (2-4) || Mohler (3-3) || || 30,114 || 58-59
|- align="center" bgcolor="bbffbb"
| 119 || August 11 || Mariners || 7 – 4 || Carpenter (7-6) || Fassero (10-8) || Quantrill (3) || 33,137 || 59-59
|- align="center" bgcolor="bbffbb"
| 120 || August 12 || Mariners || 11 – 5 || Rodríguez (2-3) || Ayala (1-8) || || 39,139 || 60-59
|- align="center" bgcolor="bbffbb"
| 121 || August 13 || Angels || 4 – 3 || Risley (1-4) || Hasegawa (6-3) || Plesac (1) || 26,481 || 61-59
|- align="center" bgcolor="ffbbbb"
| 122 || August 14 || Angels || 7 – 5 || Watson (5-7) || Hentgen (10-9) || Percival (33) || 27,276 || 61-60
|- align="center" bgcolor="ffbbbb"
| 123 || August 15 || Angels || 6 – 3 (11)|| DeLucia (2-4) || Sinclair (0-1) || || 30,379 || 61-61
|- align="center" bgcolor="bbffbb"
| 124 || August 16 || Angels || 6 – 4 || Carpenter (8-6) || Juden (0-1) || Quantrill (4) || 29,259 || 62-61
|- align="center" bgcolor="bbffbb"
| 125 || August 17 || @ Athletics || 4 – 2 || Escobar (2-1) || Candiotti (8-14) || Plesac (2) || 9,761 || 63-61
|- align="center" bgcolor="ffbbbb"
| 126 || August 18 || @ Athletics || 10 – 5 || Haynes (9-5) || Williams  (9-8) || || 9,086 || 63-62
|- align="center" bgcolor="bbffbb"
| 127 || August 19 || @ Mariners || 16 – 2 || Hentgen (11-9) || Cloude (7-9) || Stieb (1) || 26,258 || 64-62
|- align="center" bgcolor="bbffbb"
| 128 || August 20 || @ Mariners || 7 – 0 || Clemens (15-6) || Swift (10-7) || || 26,642 || 65-62
|- align="center" bgcolor="bbffbb"
| 129 || August 21 || @ Angels || 9 – 4 || Carpenter (9-6) || Juden (0-2) || || 36,052 || 66-62
|- align="center" bgcolor="ffbbbb"
| 130 || August 22 || @ Angels || 5 – 1 || Sparks (8-2) || Escobar (2-2) || Hasegawa (3) || 42,882 || 66-63
|- align="center" bgcolor="ffbbbb"
| 131 || August 23 || @ Angels || 3 – 2 || Finley (10-6) || Almanzar (1-1) || Percival (35) || 34,142 || 66-64
|- align="center" bgcolor="ffbbbb"
| 132 || August 24 || Royals || 7 – 3 || Barber (1-1) || Hentgen (11-10) || Whisenant (2) || 26,306 || 66-65
|- align="center" bgcolor="bbffbb"
| 133 || August 25 || Royals || 3 – 0 || Clemens (16-6) || Haney (5-6) || || 26,173 || 67-65
|- align="center" bgcolor="ffbbbb"
| 134 || August 26 || Royals || 7 – 2 || Belcher (12-10) || Carpenter (9-7) || || 25,557 || 67-66
|- align="center" bgcolor="bbffbb"
| 135 || August 27 || Royals || 11 – 1 || Escobar (3-2) || Rosado (7-10) || || 25,524 || 68-66
|- align="center" bgcolor="bbffbb"
| 136 || August 28 || Twins || 7 – 6 || Williams  (10-8) || Trombley (4-4) || Plesac (3) || 26,268 || 69-66
|- align="center" bgcolor="bbffbb"
| 137 || August 29 || Twins || 14 – 7 || Stieb (1-1) || Radke (10-13) || || 30,101 || 70-66
|- align="center" bgcolor="bbffbb"
| 138 || August 30 || Twins || 6 – 0 || Clemens (17-6) || Rodriguez (4-3) || || 29,202 || 71-66
|-

|- align="center" bgcolor="bbffbb"
| 139 || September 1 || @ Royals || 2 – 1 || Carpenter (10-7) || Belcher (12-11) || Quantrill (5) || 12,447 || 72-66
|- align="center" bgcolor="bbffbb"
| 140 || September 2 || @ Royals || 5 – 0 || Escobar (4-2) || Rosado (7-11) || Quantrill (6) || 12,541 || 73-66
|- align="center" bgcolor="bbffbb"
| 141 || September 3 || Red Sox || 4 – 3 (11)|| Person (3-0) || Veras (0-1) || || 27,226 || 74-66
|- align="center" bgcolor="bbffbb"
| 142 || September 4 || Red Sox || 12 – 1 || Hentgen (12-10) || Wakefield (15-7) || Stieb (2) || 29,166 || 75-66
|- align="center" bgcolor="bbffbb"
| 143 || September 5 || Red Sox || 4 – 3 || Clemens (18-6) || Saberhagen (12-7) || Quantrill (7) || 37,158 || 76-66
|- align="center" bgcolor="bbffbb"
| 144 || September 6 || Red Sox || 8 – 7 || Quantrill (3-4) || Lowe (3-9) || Person (1) || 38,374 || 77-66
|- align="center" bgcolor="bbffbb"
| 145 || September 7 || Indians || 15 – 1 || Escobar (5-2) || Ogea (4-3) || || 31,089 || 78-66
|- align="center" bgcolor="ffbbbb"
| 146 || September 9 || Indians || 6 – 3 (13)|| Jones (1-2) || Almanzar (1-2) || Jackson (37) || 32,157 || 78-67
|- align="center" bgcolor="ffbbbb"
| 147 || September 10 || @ Yankees || 8 – 5 || Pettitte (16-9) || Hentgen (12-11) || Holmes (2) || 25,881 || 78-68
|- align="center" bgcolor="bbffbb"
| 148 || September 11 || @ Yankees || 5 – 4 || Almanzar (2-2) || Irabu (11-9) || Person (2) || 35,856 || 79-68
|- align="center" bgcolor="bbffbb"
| 149 || September 12 || @ Yankees || 5 – 3 || Carpenter (11-7) || Wells (17-4) || Person (3) || 48,752 || 80-68
|- align="center" bgcolor="bbffbb"
| 150 || September 13 || @ Yankees || 5 – 3 || Escobar (6-2) || Cone (19-6) || Person (4) || 47,471 || 81-68
|- align="center" bgcolor="ffbbbb"
| 151 || September 14 || @ Indians || 6 – 3 || Gooden (8-6) || Sinclair (0-2) || Jackson (39) || 43,152 || 81-69
|- align="center" bgcolor="ffbbbb"
| 152 || September 15 || @ Indians || 7 – 5 || Ogea (5-3) || Stieb (1-2) || Assenmacher (2) || 43,323 || 81-70
|- align="center" bgcolor="bbffbb"
| 153 || September 16 || @ Tigers || 2 – 1 || Clemens (19-6) || Powell (3-8) || Person (5) || 10,967 || 82-70
|- align="center" bgcolor="ffbbbb"
| 154 || September 17 || @ Tigers || 7 – 4 || Brocail (5-2) || Person (3-1) || || 13,304 || 82-71
|- align="center" bgcolor="ffbbbb"
| 155 || September 18 || @ Devil Rays || 6 – 1 || Rekar (2-7) || Escobar (6-3) || || 32,053 || 82-72
|- align="center" bgcolor="ffbbbb"
| 156 || September 19 || @ Devil Rays || 7 – 5 || Lopez (7-3) || Van Ryn (0-1) || Hernández (26) || 35,689 || 82-73
|- align="center" bgcolor="bbffbb"
| 157 || September 20 || @ Devil Rays || 7 – 5 (12)|| Risley (2-4) || Lopez (7-4) || || 32,183 || 83-73
|- align="center" bgcolor="bbffbb"
| 158 || September 21 || Orioles || 3 – 1 || Clemens (20-6) || Erickson (15-13) || Plesac (4) || 30,380 || 84-73
|- align="center" bgcolor="bbffbb"
| 159 || September 22 || Orioles || 7 – 3 || Carpenter (12-7) || Mussina (13-9) || || 26,363 || 85-73
|- align="center" bgcolor="bbffbb"
| 160 || September 23 || Orioles || 6 – 3 || Escobar (7-3) || Guzmán (10-16) || Person (6) || 28,147 || 86-73
|- align="center" bgcolor="ffbbbb"
| 161 || September 25 || Tigers || 7 – 5 || Moehler (14-13) || Williams  (10-9) || Jones (28) || 33,151 || 86-74
|- align="center" bgcolor="bbffbb"
| 162 || September 26 || Tigers || 5 – 4 (13)|| Risley (3-4) || Sager (4-2) || || 40,268 || 87-74
|- align="center" bgcolor="bbffbb"
| 163 || September 27 || Tigers || 2 – 1 || Halladay (1-0) || Thompson (11-15) || || 38,036 || 88-74
|-

Player stats

Batting

Starters by position
Note: Pos = Position; G = Games played; AB = At bats; R = Runs; H = Hits; HR = Home runs; RBI = Runs batted in; Avg. = Batting average; Slg. = Slugging Average; SB = Stolen bases

Other batters
Note: G = Games played; AB = At bats; H = Hits; Avg. = Batting average; HR = Home runs; RBI = Runs batted in

Pitching

Starting pitchers
Note: G = Games pitched; IP = Innings pitched; W = Wins; L = Losses; ERA = Earned run average; SO = Strikeouts

Other pitchers
Note: G = Games pitched; IP = Innings pitched; W = Wins; L = Losses; ERA = Earned run average; SO = Strikeouts

Relief pitchers
Note: G = Games pitched; W = Wins; L = Losses; SV = Saves; ERA = Earned run average; SO = Strikeouts

Award winners
José Canseco, DH, Silver Slugger Award
Roger Clemens, Pitcher of the Month Award, August
Roger Clemens, Cy Young Award
Roger Clemens, MLB Leader Wins, 20
Roger Clemens, AL Strikeout Crown, 271 Strikeouts
Roger Clemens, AL ERA Crown, 2.65
Roger Clemens, Major League Record, First Pitcher to win Five Cy Young Awards
All-Star Game
 Roger Clemens, P

Farm system

References

External links
1998 Toronto Blue Jays at Baseball Reference
1998 Toronto Blue Jays at Baseball Almanac

Toronto Blue Jays seasons
Toronto Blue Jays season
1998 in Canadian sports
Blue Jays